1999 in Armenian football was the eighth season of independent football after the split-up from the Soviet Union. The Armenian Premier League for 1999 existed of 10 teams of which the three lowest ranked teams would relegate to the Armenian First League. The seventh ranked team would enter the promotion/relegation play-off with the second ranked team of the First League. Only the winner of that competition was promoted directly.

Premier League
 Zvartnots-AAL are promoted.
 Kilikia F.C. returned to professional football.
 Erebuni-Homenmen changed their name to Erebuni FC.
 Shirak-2 changed their name to FC Gyumri.
 Karabakh were relocated from Yerevan to Stepanakert.

Promotion and relegation play-off

Top goalscorers

First League
 Dinamo-Energo Yerevan changed its name back to Dinamo Yerevan.
 Arpa returned to professional football.
 In the middle of the season, FC Kasakh was dissolved and its position was taken over with a newly founded FC Mika-Kasakh.

Armenia Cup

External links
 RSSSF: Armenia 1999